Kenneth Irvine Chenault (born June 2, 1951) is an American business executive. He was the CEO and Chairman of American Express from 2001 until 2018.  He is the third African American CEO of a Fortune 500 company.

Early life and education
Chenault was born in Mineola, New York, the son of a dentist and dental hygienist. His father, Hortenius Chenault, was a graduate of Morehouse College and Howard University Dental School. The elder Chenault passed the New York State dental exam with the highest score ever recorded as of January 2014. Chenault is a member of Phi Beta Sigma fraternity. Kenneth Chenault attended the Waldorf School of Garden City, where he served as senior class president. He then received a B.A. in history from Bowdoin College in 1973 and a J.D. from Harvard Law School in 1976.

Career
Chenault began his career as an associate at the law firm Rogers & Wells (1977–1979) in New York City, and as a consultant for Bain & Company (1979–1981).

Chenault joined American Express in 1981, working in its Strategic Planning Group. He became president and chief operating officer in 1997. He became CEO of American Express in 2001.

Chenault has served on several boards throughout his career. Beginning in 2007, he served on the Executive Committee of the Business Roundtable and a member of the Council on Foreign Relations. Chenault served as a member of the Executive Committee of The Business Council in 2011 and 2012.

In 1995, Ebony listed him as one of 50 "living pioneers" in the African-American community.  Chenault was inducted into the Junior Achievement U.S. Business Hall of Fame in 2002.  In 2008, he gave the commencement address at Howard University.

In May 2010, he gave the commencement speech at Wake Forest University and Northeastern University.

As CEO of American Express in 2007 and 2008, Chenault earned a total compensation of $50,126,585 and $42,752,461 respectively. In 2009, he earned a total compensation of $16,617,639, which included a base salary of $1,201,923, a cash bonus of $10,450,000, an option grant of $3,985,637, and other compensation worth $980,079. In 2016, Chenault earned a total compensation of $22 million.

On October 18, 2017, he announced that he would retire as its chairman and chief executive on February 1, 2018. He was succeeded by Stephen J. Squeri. In December 2018, it was announced that Chenault would step down from his board roles at IBM and Procter & Gamble on February 13, 2019.

In January 2018, Chenault announced he would become chairman and managing director of General Catalyst Partners and joined the board of directors of Airbnb. Chenault has served on the board of directors of Facebook since February 2018. In March 2020 it was announced that Chenault was stepping down from the Facebook board and joining the board of Berkshire Hathaway, replacing Bill Gates.

Civic activities

On November 15, 2010, Old North Foundation recognized Chenault with its Third Lantern Award for individual commitment and dedication to public service. The Foundation honored Chenault and American Express for their significant contributions to the preservation efforts of many significant monuments and landmark structures, including the steeple of the Old North Church.
Chenault and wife, Kathryn, are founding donors to the Art for Justice Fund, which aims to reduce prison populations and strengthen employment opportunities for those leaving.

On February 10, 2014, it was announced that he had been elected to fill a vacated seat of the Harvard Corporation; the Corporation is the chief fiduciary authority of the University and is the smaller of the two governing boards, the other being the Harvard Board of Overseers.

On February 6, 2017, Chenault was named Chair of the Advisory Council for the Smithsonian's National Museum of African American History and Culture.

In April 2019, he was appointed as a member of the NCAA's Board of Governors. In 2021, he appeared on the Time 100, Times annual list of the 100 most influential people in the world.

Personal life
Chenault resides in New Rochelle, New York, with his wife and children. Chenault is a member of Westchester Country Club.

References

External links

 

1951 births
Living people
African-American businesspeople
American chief executives of financial services companies
American Express people
American management consultants
Bain & Company employees
Bowdoin College alumni
Directors of Facebook
Directors of IBM
Harvard Law School alumni
People from Mineola, New York
Businesspeople from New Rochelle, New York
Waldorf school alumni
American chief executives of Fortune 500 companies
African-American history of Westchester County, New York